Wojtas is a Polish surname. It may refer to:
 Alina Wojtas (born 1987), Polish handball player
 Arkadiusz Wojtas (born 1977), Polish cyclist
 Edward Wojtas (1955–2010), Polish politician
 Jan Wojtas (born 1966), Polish biathlete
 Tadeusz Wojtas (born 1955), Polish cyclist
 Wiktor Wojtas (born 1986), Polish esports player

See also
 

Polish-language surnames